Girolamo Dandini (1554–1634) was an Italian Jesuit and academic.

Life
He was born in Cesena. With Juan Maldonado he was the first Jesuit professor in Paris, at the Collège de Clermont; there he taught François de Sales. Later he was professor of theology at Perugia.

He was sent in 1596 by Pope Clement VIII as nuncio to Lebanon, to preside at a general Maronite council, for the purpose of introducing certain liturgical reforms. It was held at the Qannubin Monastery. On the way Dandini visited Cyprus; he was accompanied by Fabio Bruno, who had been on an earlier mission in 1580 with Giovanni Battista Eliano.

Works
His De corpore animato was one of the last scholastic analyses of the intelligible species concept in Aristotle.

He was author of an Ethica sacra: hoc est de virtutibus, et vitiis libri quinquaginta, published in 1651.

In 1656 his account of his mission in Lebanon was published as Missione apostolica al patriarca, e maroniti del Monte Libano. It was translated into French by Richard Simon as Voyage au Mont Liban (1675).

Notes

Sources

External links
 
WorldCat page
CERL page

1554 births
1634 deaths
Academic staff of the University of Perugia
16th-century Italian Jesuits
People from Cesena
17th-century Italian Jesuits
Lycée Louis-le-Grand teachers